Plastic Fantastic: How the Biggest Fraud in Physics Shook the Scientific World is a 2009 book by American-based science reporter Eugenie Samuel Reich.

Plot
In Plastic Fantastic, Reich investigates how Jan Hendrik Schön, a young physicist working in the field of advanced microelectronics at Bell Labs, was able to repeatedly fabricate scientific results to mislead his collaborators, journal editors, and the scientific community. The book is based on interviews with 126 scientists.

The book carries , and was initially published by Palgrave MacMillan.

See also
List of books about the politics of science
The Great Betrayal: Fraud In Science
Scientific misconduct

References

2009 non-fiction books
Books about the politics of science
Criticism of science
Physics books
Scientific misconduct incidents